The Eagle's Mate is a 1914 American silent drama film produced by the Famous Players film company and released through Paramount Pictures. The film starred Mary Pickford and was her first film working with the actor/director James Kirkwood. The film is based on a novel, The Eagle's Mate, by Anna Alice Chapin. It is a surviving film.

Cast
Mary Pickford as Anemone Breckenridge
James Kirkwood as Lancer Morne
Ida Waterman as Sally Breckenridge
Robert Broderick as Abner Morne

Unbilled:
Harry C. Browne as Fisher Morne
Helen Gilmore as Hagar Morne
Jack Pickford as A young clansman
R. J. Henry as Luke Ellsworth
Russell Bassett as Rev. Hotchkiss
J. Albert Hall
Robert Milasch as Mountaineer

Reception
Like many American films of the time, The Eagle's Mate was subject to cuts by city and state film censorship boards. For example, for the 1918 re-release of the film the Chicago Board of Censors required cuts, in Reel 2, of all scenes where men fall after being shot, Reel 3, man tearing opponent's mouth in fight, and, Reel 5, Fisher shooting her husband.

References

External links

large Famous Players movie herald ad(archived)
lantern slide for 1918 re-release(archived)

1914 films
Silent American drama films
American silent feature films
Films directed by James Kirkwood Sr.
Films based on American novels
1914 drama films
American black-and-white films
1910s American films
1910s English-language films